Loyola is a residential district of the Borough Côte-des-Neiges—Notre-Dame-de-Grâce within the City of Montreal, Quebec, Canada. It is one of five districts of the borough. In 2011, it had a population of 36,984 of which only 17% spoke French in the home.

References

Neighbourhoods in Montreal